Shubham Thakur (born 1 October 1995) is an Indian cricketer. He made his Twenty20 debut for Chhattisgarh in the 2016–17 Inter State Twenty-20 Tournament on 3 February 2017. He made his List A debut for Chhattisgarh in the 2016–17 Vijay Hazare Trophy on 1 March 2017.

References

External links
 

1995 births
Living people
Indian cricketers
Chhattisgarh cricketers
Cricketers from Chhattisgarh